Francis Xavier Kaname Shimamoto (February 14, 1932 - August 31, 2002) was a bishop of the Catholic Church. His baptismal name was "Francis Xavier". Shimamoto was ordained a Catholic priest on 23 November 1958. In 1979 he was appointed Bishop of the Roman Catholic Diocese of Urawa and consecrated on 20 March 1980. In 1990 Pope John Paul II appointed him Archbishop of the Roman Catholic Archdiocese of Nagasaki. On 31 August 2002 Shimamoto died.

References

External links
 http://www.catholic-hierarchy.org/bishop/bshim.html 

1932 births
2002 deaths
People from Nagasaki Prefecture
20th-century Roman Catholic bishops in Japan
Japanese Roman Catholic bishops